Protapamea is a genus of moths of the family Noctuidae.

Species
 Protapamea danieli Quinter, 2009
 Protapamea louisae Quinter, 2009

Noctuidae